The 2013 ICC European Twenty20 Championship Division One was a cricket tournament that took place from 8–14 July 2013. It formed part of the European Cricket Championship. England hosted the event.

Teams
Teams that qualified are as follows:

Group A

Group B

Squads
The squads were released at CricketEurope4.net.

Group stage

Group A

Fixtures

Group B

Fixtures

Play-offs
Play-offs are scheduled for 13 July; 14 July is a "Reserve Day", if needed.

11th-12th Place Play-off Semi-Final

9th-10th Place Play-off Semi-Final

7th-8th Place Play-off Semi-Final

5th-6th Place Play-off Semi-Final

Semi-final

Final

Final Placings

See also

2013 ICC World Twenty20 Qualifier
European Cricket Championship

References

2014 ICC World Twenty20
European Cricket Championship
2013 in English cricket
International cricket competitions in England